John M. Paxton Jr. (born June 25, 1951) is a retired United States Marine Corps four-star general who served as the 33rd Assistant Commandant of the Marine Corps. He previously served as the Commanding General of United States Marine Corps Forces Command; Commanding General, Fleet Marine Force Atlantic; Commander, United States Marine Corps Forces, Europe, as well as II Marine Expeditionary Force. Paxton retired on August 4, 2016, after 42 years of service.

Previously, Paxton was Director, J3 - Operations, The Joint Staff and Chief of Staff, Multinational Forces-Iraq. U.S. Defense Secretary Robert M. Gates announced on March 13, 2008, Paxton's nomination for appointment to the rank of lieutenant general, and for assignment as Director, Strategic Plans & Policy, J-5, The Joint Staff. On May 22, 2007, Paxton relinquished command of the 1st Marine Division to take the role of Chief of Staff for Multi-National Force-Iraq.

Early life and education
Born in Chester, Pennsylvania on June 25, 1951, Paxton attended Cornell University in Ithaca, New York, earning both a bachelor's degree and a master's degree in Civil Engineering. He was elected to the Sphinx Head Society during his senior year. Moreover, he was a member of Delta Upsilon fraternity throughout his undergraduate years at Cornell. Upon completion of Officer Candidates School, he was commissioned a second lieutenant in the United States Marine Corps in 1974.

In addition to The Basic School, Paxton's professional education includes United States Marine Corps Amphibious Warfare School (non-resident), United States Army Infantry Officer Advanced Course, and the United States Marine Corps Command and Staff College. From 1994 to 1995 Paxton was a Federal Executive Fellow in Foreign Policy Studies at the Brookings Institution. He has also been a Marine Corps Fellow at Massachusetts Institute of Technology's Seminar XXI.

Military career

Upon completion of The Basic School, Paxton was ordered to Airborne School at Fort Benning, Georgia and then assigned as a Rifle Platoon Commander in Bravo Company, 1st Battalion, 3rd Marines, 1st Marine Brigade, Kaneohe, Hawaii.

Paxton served twice with the 1st Marine Division (3rd Battalion, 5th Marines and 1st Marines), once with the 2nd Marine Division (1st Battalion, 8th Marines), and twice with the 3rd Marine Division (1st Battalion, 3rd Marines and 2nd Battalion, 4th Marines), commanding at the platoon, company, battalion and regimental levels. He commanded Battalion Landing Team 1/8 from April 1992 to June 1994. They deployed with 22nd Marine Expeditionary Unit Special Operations Capable and  Battle Group as Landing Force 6th Fleet (LF6F 2-93) and Joint Adaptive Task Force 93-2 in support of operations in Bosnia-Herzegovina, and later as United Nations Quick Reaction Force (QRF) in Mogadishu, Somalia.

In addition to command, Paxton also served in Operations, Plans and Training (G3/S3) at the battalion, regiment, division (1st and 2nd Marine Divisions) and Marine Expeditionary Force (II-MEF) levels. Non-Fleet Marine Force tours included Commanding Officer Company B, Marine Barracks, 8th & I, Washington, D.C. (1980–81); Commanding Officer Marine Corps Recruiting Station New York, New York (1985–88); Strategic Plans Branch (PLS), Plans, Policies and Operations (PP&O) Department, Headquarters United States Marine Corps; and as Executive Assistant and Marine Corps Aide to the Under Secretary of the Navy (1996–97). Paxton is a Joint Service Officer, having served at United Nations Command/Combined Forces Command in South Korea from 1989 to 1991 as Amphibious Operations Officer and Executive Officer, Crisis Action Team.

From June 1997 to June 1998, Paxton was the Assistant Chief of Staff G3 (Operations, Plans and Training).  His next assignment, from June 1998 to June 2000, was commanding officer of 1st Marine Regiment. From 2000 to 2001, Paxton had a one-year tour as the United States Marine Corps Fellow (National Security Studies) at the Council on Foreign Relations in New York. From July 2001 to August 2003, he was the Director, Programs Division (RP), and Assistant Deputy Commandant of the Marine Corps for Programs and Resources (ADC,P&R), Headquarters Marine Corps.

From 2003 to 2006, Paxton served as Commanding General, Marine Corps Recruit Depot San Diego and Western Recruiting Region. On May 22, 2007, Paxton relinquished command of the 1st Marine Division to Brigadier General Richard P. Mills. Paxton next served as the Chief of Staff to the commander of Multi-National Force - Iraq. Advanced to lieutenant general in 2008, Paxton served initially as Director, Strategic Plans and Policy (J-5) on the Joint Staff, then was nominated and confirmed to the Operations Directorate (J-3), where he served until appointment as CG, II MEF; and CG, Marine Forces, Africa. Before departing the Pentagon, Paxton also served as interim director, The Joint Staff.

Paxton retired in August 2016. Paxton is an Advisory Board Member of Spirit of America, a 501(c)(3) organization that supports the safety and success of US troops serving abroad.

Awards and decorations
 

Paxton also holds several awards of the expert rifle badge and the sharpshooter pistol marksmanship badge.

References

Further reading

|-

|-

|-

|-

|-

|-

1951 births
Assistant Commandants of the United States Marine Corps
Cornell University College of Engineering alumni
Living people
People from Chester, Pennsylvania
People from Delaware County, Pennsylvania
Recipients of the Legion of Merit
Recipients of the Defense Distinguished Service Medal
United States Marine Corps generals
Military personnel from Pennsylvania